Berri Barmera Council is a local government area in the Riverland region of South Australia.

It includes the towns of Barmera, Berri, Cobdogla, Glossop, Katarapko, Loveday and Winkie, and parts of Monash and Overland Corner.

History

The Berri Barmera Council was created on 1 October 1996 with the amalgamation of the District Council of Barmera and the District Council of Berri.

The District Council of Berri had been created in 1922, 11 years after the town was proclaimed. Its first major project was to provide reliable electricity to the entire area. It bought the Berri Electric Supply Company in 1936 to facilitate this, and later sold it to the Electricity Trust of South Australia, a state government agency.

The District Council of Barmera had been created as the "District Council of Cobdogla" on 17 June 1925 and been renamed Barmera in 1937. Barmera had been a soldier settlement community after World War I.

Councillors

The Berri Barmera Council has a directly-elected mayor.

References

External links
Council website

Berri Barmera
Riverland